The state highways are arterial routes of a state, linking district headquarters and important towns within the state and connecting them with national highways or highways of the neighbouring states.

Introduction
Maharashtra state has a good road network. There are 10088 national highways and many state highways with total length of 33,705 km. Major state highways are MH MSH 1, MH MSH 3, MH MSH 6, MH MSH 9, MH MSH 10,MH MSH 11.

Major state highways

State highways

References
Pradhan Mantri Gram Sadak Yojna
Public Works Department, Government of Maharashtra

State Highways
 
Maharashtra State Highways
State Highways